Gangneung is a municipal city in the province of Gangwon-do, on the east coast of South Korea. It has a population of 213,658 (as of 2017). Gangneung is the economic centre of the Yeongdong region of Gangwon-do. Gangneung has many tourist attractions, such as Jeongdongjin, a very popular area for watching the sun rise, and Gyeongpo Beach. There is an ROKAF airbase south of downtown Gangneung that formerly doubled as a civil airport.

The city hosted all the ice events for the 2018 Winter Olympics.

History 
Gangneung was the home of the Yemaek people in ancient times and became the land of Wiman Joseon in 129 BC. In 128 BC, Nam Ryeo, the army officer of Yaekam, punished Wujang of Wiman Korea and became the territory of the Han dynasty. In the 14th year of Goguryeo Muchheon (313), it entered Goguryeo territory.

In 639, Silla occupied this place and ruled it as a 'Sogyeong'. In 658, King Moo-yeong abolished the Sogyeong and made an arsenal to send the todok, because it was adjacent to Malgal. In 757, it was renamed Sungju and restored it in 776.

It was renamed Myungju again during the Goryeo period, and it was under the jurisdiction the north of Chuncheon in the 14th year of Sungjong (995). It separated the Hamgyeong-do from the Gangeung and called it Gangneung-do, but it has always been the center of administration and military. At the beginning of the Joseon Dynasty, it called to Hwadangdo and Wonchundo and rename Gangneung by the name of Gangwon Province in the 5th year of King Sejong (1423).

Some areas have been incorporated into Yangyang since 1945, and Gangneung City was established in 1995 as the areas of Gangneung and Myeongju merged.

On 18 September 1996 a North Korean submarine ran aground near Gangneung in an attempted infiltration mission, spurring a 49-day manhunt for the escaped passengers. For more details, refer to the 1996 Gangneung submarine infiltration incident.

Symbols of Gangneung 
The flag of the city shows a red sun in the centre and blue wave in front, on a white background. The sun represents the sunrise, the wave the sea. The flower of the city is the crepe myrtle, the tree of the city is the pine tree, its bird the swan. The animal of Gangneung is the tiger.

Geography 
Gangneung is located to the east of the Taebaek Mountains, which is the considered the 'waist' of the Korean peninsula. To the East is the Sea of Japan, and to the west are the inner side of Hongcheon County, the Pyeongchang County's Jinbu-myeon and the Daegwallyeong-myeon respectively. The southern side is connected to Donghae City and the Jeongseon County's critical side. The north side is adjacent to Yangyang County Hyunbuk-myeon and Hyunnam-myeon.

Climate 
Gangneung experiences a humid subtropical climate (Köppen: Cfa) with cool to cold winters and hot, humid summers. Since Gangneung is a coastal city, it has generally milder winters and relatively cooler summers than the rest of Korea. It is bordered by mountains to the west and the sea to the east.

Administrative divisions 
The district includes one town (eup), seven townships (myeon), 13 neighborhoods (dong).

Tour

Sunrise 
Sunrises, especially the first in the New Year, are important in traditional Korean culture. The Jeongdongjin and Gyeongpo beaches in Gangneung are popular places to enjoy a sunrise.

Gyeongpodae Area

Gangneung is considered special due to its access to both a lake and the sea. Gyeongpodae is a pavilion overlooking a Gyeongpo lake. It is said that one can see the moon five times when at Gyeongpodae. One sees the moon once in the sky, once reflected in the lake, once reflected in the sea, once reflected in the drinking glass, and once more in the eyes of a lover. The site of Gyeongpodae is known for its location east of the centre of the city.

Inside the Gyeongpodae pavilion, built with 28 pillars, is the Gyeongpodaebu, a poem by Yul Gok. Gyeongpodaebu describes the movement of the heavens and the moon. The best view of the moon is on the 15th of the lunar month.

The nearby Gyeongpo Beach has a sandy beach and a line of fresh seafood restaurants, with its proximity to Seoul making it a popular summer destination.

Beach 

In addition to the Jungdongjin beach where Sandglass, a TV series was taken, there are 18 beaches such as Anmok beach, Gyeongpo beach, Gangmun beach.

Jungdongjin 
Jeongdongjin Beach is about 250 meters long and is famous for its beautiful sunrise scenery. In particular, the sunrise seen from the top of Goseong Mountain is known to be the most beautiful.

Culture

Heritage 

There are a total of 128 cultural properties in Gangneung. Among them, there are 34 State-designated heritage and 58 Province-designated heritage.

National Treasure No. 51, a gate to an official inn, is in Gangneung. This gate is the front gate of the Gangneung official inn built in the Goryeo Dynasty. It is the oldest gate in the Goryeo Dynasty and is the only cultural property designated as a national treasure among the buildings in Gangwon-do.

Ojukheon is the birthplace of Shin Saimdang and Yulgok Lee. It was designated as Treasure No. 165 by being recognized as one of the oldest architecture in the Korea and being a rare example of preserving the shape of the house of the Joseon Dynasty.

Gangneung Guseongsa site, which was founded by Burma in the 13th year of King Munsung of Silla(851), has been designated as Korea's Historic Site No.448. Inside the temple, treasures are designated as Treasures No. 85, Treasures No. 86, There is a stone Buddhist image designated as No. 38.

Festivals 
Gangneung has numerous festivals. The biggest and most famous is the Gangneung Dano Festival (강릉단오제) at the Dano fairground near the Namdae River. In 1967, the Gangneung Dano Festival was designated Korean National Immaterial Cultural Heritage No. 13. On November 11, 2005, it was designated by UNESCO as one of the "Masterpieces of the Oral and Intangible Heritage of Humanity". Nowadays, it is a combination of several commemoration rites and traditional plays. A highlight is the traditional Gwanno Mask Dance (Gwanno Gamyeongeuk), which is only performed at this festival.

In addition to well established festivals like the Dano, there are several newer festivals in Gangneung, such as the IJAF (International Junior Art Festival) enjoys great popularity. The IJAF is a cultural festival for youth from all over the world. The festival includes both performances of the participating groups and a diversified cultural program demonstrating the essence of Korean culture. Since 2002, the IJAF takes place at Gyeongpo Beach in the end of July. Also, the Gyeongpo Rock Festival was established in 2006. This festival, mostly attracting young people, offers young Korean bands from the Gangneung area a stage for their performances.

Museum 
There are a number of historical remains and museums in Gangneung. The most prominent being the Ojukheon Museum, which is named after a special black bamboo growing in this area. It was the birthplace of the famous artist, calligrapher and poet Shin Saimdang (1504–1551) (whose image is on the 50,000 won note), and her son, the scholar Yulgok (1536–1584) (whose image is on the South Korean 5,000 won note). In 1963, the Ojukheon Museum was designated as National Cultural Heritage No. 165. It includes one of the oldest wooden buildings in Korea. The Hwanhee and Fantapia Museums, established in 2013, opened anew in November 2020 Housed in a new structure of contemporary architecture it is the only cup museum in Asia. The museum's collection contains 2,000 cups from 70 countries. Currently, 1,500 are on display.

Several shrines and old residential buildings deliver insight into the lives of these famous Koreans. Next to the Ojukheon Museum there is the Gangneung Municipal Museum which shows folklore and antique pieces from the history of the city. Located in the hills surrounding Gangneung City, there is the revealing Daegwallyeong Museum. It consists of a private collection with more than 1000 artifacts and shows the agricultural history of the region.

Religious architecture 
Gangneung Imdeungdong Cathedral is a cathedral-style Roman Catholic sanctuary in Gangwon province. It was constructed in the 1950s. It became Registered cultural heritage No.457.

Transportation 
On Gangneung city, the expressway is Donghae Expressway which connects Incheon to Gangneung and Yeongdong Expressway which connects Yangyang County and Donghae City. National highway is National Route 7(part of Asian Highway Route 6) which connects Goseong County to Busan. It takes about 2 hours and 30 minutes to Seoul by road.

The Yeongdong Line passes Yeongju city to Gangneung. before 2006, Saemaeul-ho stopped at Jeongdongjin station and Gangneung station and it took 5.5 hours at Cheongnyangni station, but now only Mugunghwa-ho is stopped, It takes 6 hours to drive. In 2017, Gyeonggang Line was opened and Gangneung station was designated as an essential-stop station. The time between Gangneung station and Cheongnyangni station has been reduced from the existing 6 hours to the minimum of 114 minutes after KTX operation.

It was operated by Gangneung Airport for air traffic, but passed the passenger transportation right to Yangyang International Airport in 2002 and closed its service as an airport.

Road 
Yeongdong Expressway passed city west to east, Donghae Expressway passed through the city from south to north. National Route 6, 7, 35, 59 passed through city.

Train 
KTX-Sancheon is essential stop Jinbu and Gangneung station. On 2018 Winter Olympics period, increased frequency of KTX.

Buses 
Local transit operators connect communities in the city divided three regions. This is managed by Gangneung City Office and the operation is carried out by each transportation company.

Gangneung Intercity Bus Terminal operates the intercity bus and operates six Express Bus line in the Gangneung Express Bus Terminal, the largest terminal in Gangwon Province.

Taxi 
A total of 589 units in Gangneung are operating taxi licenses. The basic fare of Gangneung city taxi is 2,800 won for 2 km. After that, 100 won will be charged for 152m from 2 km to 6 km, and 200 won will be charged for 152m after 6 km. but Jumunjin area, Gangdong-meon, Okgye area are designated as exceptional areas to 45% extra charge.

Sea transport 
Gangneung Port Passenger Terminal of Gangneung Harbor handles the Gangneung-Ulneung passenger ship.

Sports

Football 
Gangneung is the home of the K3 League football club Gangneung City FC and is one of the two cities where K League football team Gangwon FC plays its home matches. Since 1976, Gangneung Jeil High School and Gangneung Junior high school soccer team rivalry Derby, which is held every day in the Dano Festival, have become popular.

Ice Hockey 
In 2016, Daemyung Killer Whales, which is affiliated with the Gangneung Hockey Center, is active in the Asia League Ice Hockey.

2018 Winter Olympics 
The city 'Gangneung Coastal Cluster' was the venue for the indoor sports of the 2018 Winter Olympics and Paralympics in Pyeongchang. All these facilities, except for the Gangneung Curling Centre, were built for the Olympics.

Gangneung Olympic Park
Gangneung Hockey Centre – Ice Hockey (Olympics and Paralympics)
Gangneung Curling Centre – Curling (Olympics and Paralympics)
Gangneung Oval – Speed skating
Gangneung Ice Arena – Short track speed skating and Figure skating
Kwandong Hockey Centre - Ice Hockey (Olympics)

The city also hosted an Olympic Village for the athletes and a media village.

Image gallery

Sister cities 
  Chichibu, Saitama, Japan, since February 16, 1983
  Öskemen, East Kazakhstan, Kazakhstan, since 2011
  Mangshi, Yunnan, China, since November 21, 2012
  Indang, Cavite, Philippines, since 2013
  Algemesí, Spain, since 2015

Notable people
 Edward Young-min Kwon, celebrity chef
 Yeon Woo-jin, actor
 JR (NU'EST), idol
 Yezi (Fiestar), idol
Kim Seo-hyung, actress
Jeon Yeo-bin, actress
Sin Saimdang, a Korean artist, writer, calligraphist, and poet.
Kim Bo-sung, a South Korean actor
Yi I, a Korean philosopher and writer
Choi Han-bit, model, actress, singer and idol

See also 
 1996 Gangneung submarine infiltration incident
 List of cities in South Korea

References

External links 

 City government home page
 Gangneung-si: Official Site of Korea Tourism Org 
 Seongyojang House

 

 
Cities in Gangwon Province, South Korea
Port cities and towns in South Korea